The Akademia Lechia Gdańsk (Lechia Gdańsk Academy) is Lechia Gdańsk's academy section of the football club. Lechia Gdańsk II also serve as the team's official 2nd team. The Lechia Gdańsk II team is also sometimes referred to as Lechia II Gdańsk and as LG2.

The Academy
Since the early years of the clubs formation they have often had an academy to some degree with the focus of developing youth players for the first team.

In 2010 Lechia Gdańsk and Grupa Lotos set up the Akademia Piłkarska Lechia Gdańsk (APLG) meaning that development of youth players could be done away from the club itself, a decision which meant the club could focus more on the first team and because it was expected that it would be easier for the academy to get addition funds if it was not totally connected to the club. After five years of close cooperation there were disagreements with Lechia and APLG about the training of players, eventually leading to Lechia to reintroduce the academy into the club that year.

In 2015 it was announced that all of the youth teams would once again be returning to Lechia, with Lechia taking control of coaching and player development. It was announced that there would be 11 age groups which would make up the Academy starting from the Under-7's to the Under-23's. After 3 years, the Lechia Academy had 12 teams under their control, with other 200 staff seeing over the development. From the summer of 2019 the academy will be home to multiple levels of girls football teams with the formal incorporation of the Lechia Gdańsk Ladies into the Lechia Gdańsk structure.

2020-21 season

Partnerships

Lechia have partnerships with academies in the Gdańsk and surrounding regions. The agreements provide Lechia with the best players, the teams to take part in competitions organised by Lechia, and better training for the coaches. Currently Lechia have partnerships with the Rotmanka Football School, APK Jedynka Kartuzy, GAP Sparta Gdańsk, and Unia Tczew.

Current partnerships

Lechia II

The Lechia Under-23's are also known as Lechia II, due to the team playing in the Polish leagues. As of the 2019–20 season, Lechia II are playing in the "IV liga Pomerania" league, the fifth tier of Polish football. Due to the rules of 2nd teams, only 3 players in the match day squad can be over the age of 23.

The Lechia II team was first introduced for the 1953–54 Polish Cup, with the second team's first official game being on 15 November 1953 against ŁKS Łódź. The team took part in three further Cup competitions after 1953 until the 2005–06 season when the second team became a permanent squad within the club. In 2016 it was announced that Lechia would be discontinuing the second team. Lechia reversed this decision two seasons later and introduced the reserve team again for the start of the 2018–19 season.

Shortly after reforming the second team, the club had issues relating to training pitches and where a stadium where league matches could be played. Lechia II ended up playing its matches in Kolbudy, but issues towards the end of the 2021–22 season meant that this was no longer a viable option for either the club or team. Due to being unable to find a suitable ground to play matches at, Lechia II were disbanded for the 2022–23 season.

Seasons

Lechia II seasons

Notes

Honours

Honours for the Lechia II team

III Liga
Runners up: 2014-15
IV Liga
Winners: 2009-10
Third place: 2008-09
Klasa okręgowa - Gdańsk Group I
Winners: 2006-07
Klasa okręgowa - Gdańsk Group II
Winners: 2005-06

Academy graduates
Players of note who advanced through the Lechia academy who either; played for their national team, played in the Ekstraklasa, or had a long and successful career with Lechia.

1940's–1950's
Bogdan Adamczyk 
Bogdan Araminowicz 
1960's
Stanisław Burzyński 
Józef Gładysz
Jerzy Jastrzębowski
Zdzisław Puszkarz  
1970's
Tomasz Korynt 
1980's
Jacek Grembocki   
Marcin Kaczmarek
Andrzej Marchel 
Mariusz Pawlak  
Sławomir Wojciechowski 
1990's
Dawid Banaczek 
Tomasz Borkowski
Tomasz Dawidowski   
Marcin Mięciel  
Sebastian Mila   
Grzegorz Szamotulski 
Marek Zieńczuk   

2000's
Mateusz Bąk 
Marcin Pietrowski  
2010's
Paweł Dawidowicz   
Filip Dymerski 
Karol Fila 
Przemysław Frankowski  
Rafał Kobryń 
Juliusz Letniowski
Tomasz Makowski 
Egy Maulana Vikri  
Mateusz Sopoćko 
Kacper Urbański 
Mateusz Żukowski 
2020's
Jakub Kałuziński 
Filip Koperski 
Kacper Sezonienko 
Witan Sulaeman 

Key

2020-21

IV Liga (Pomeranian group) - 11th

Manager - Dominik Czajka (until 6 March 2021), Maciej Duraś (from 6 March 2021)

Lechia II stats

2019-20

IV Liga (Pomeranian group) - 8th

Manager - Dominik Czajka

Lechia II stats

2018-19

IV Liga (Pomeranian group) - 5th

Manager - Dominik Czajka

Lechia II stats

Those players marked in grey were over the age of 23 for the 2018–19 season but made at least one appearance for the second team.

2015-16

III Liga (Group D) - 9th place

Manager - Adam Fedoruk

Lechia II stats

Those players marked in grey were over the age of 23 for the 2018–19 season but made at least one appearance for the second team.

2014-15

III Liga (Group D) - 2nd place

Manager - Maciej Kalkowski (until 15 November 2014), Tomasz Unton (from 16 November 2014)

Lechia II stats

Those players marked in grey were over the age of 23 for the 2018–19 season but made at least one appearance for the second team.

1976–77

During the 1976–77 season the Lechia II team took part in both the Polish Cup and the Regional Polish Cup. The player stats shown for this season are for the Polish Cup.

1976–77 Lechia II stats

There were two players who played for Lechia II in the Regional Polish Cup, only their last names are known. These players are; Mucha and Szaniawski.

1973–74

The second season there was a Lechia II team was during the 1973–74 Polish Cup. The team only played in the cup that season, but there are no player statistics known for this team that season.

1953–54

This was the first season a second team played for Lechia Gdańsk. The only competition the second team played in for this season was the 1953–54 Polish Cup.

1953–54 Lechia II stats

References

Lechia Gdańsk
Reserve team football in Poland